"Yes Indeed" is a song by American rapper Lil Baby and Canadian rapper Drake. It was released by 4 Pockets Full, Wolfpack Music Group, Quality Control Music, Motown and Capitol Records on May 17, 2018 as the second single from Lil Baby's debut album Harder Than Ever (2018). The song was produced by Wheezy and B-Rackz. It reached number one on Billboard's Streaming Songs chart, while peaking at number six on the US Billboard Hot 100, becoming Lil Baby's first top 10 hit.

Background
On May 6, 2018, Drake was spotted with Lil Baby at OVO affiliate Preme's album release party in an Atlanta nightclub, where a snippet of the track surfaced on Quality Control CEO Pierre "Pee" Thomas's Instagram story. The next day, Lil Baby took to Twitter and tweeted: "Imagine Me And Drake Dropping A Song". On May 12, the song was premiered on OVO Sound Radio, originally surfacing under the title "Pikachu (No Keys)". The song was officially released to streaming services on May 15, 2018, under its revised title, "Yes Indeed".

Charts

Weekly charts

Year-end charts

Certifications

References

2018 singles
2018 songs
Songs written by Drake (musician)
Drake (musician) songs
Lil Baby songs
Songs written by Lil Baby
Song recordings produced by Wheezy (record producer)
Songs written by Wheezy (record producer)
Trap music songs